Guriya Jekhane Guddu Sekhane was an Indian Bengali-language television soap opera that  premiered on 21 January 2019 and airs on Bengali GEC Star Jalsha. The show, produced by Shree Venkatesh Films initially starred child artists Abhirup Sen and Pritha Ghosh in lead roles. Guriya Jekhane Guddu Sekhane was a story of two orphans who grow up together in an orphanage in North Bengal. The show then starred Arya Dasgupta (replaced by Uday Pratap Singh Rajput), Pratyusha Paul and Jeetu Kamal in lead roles. It ended on 14 March 2020 and got replaced by another SVF-produced show Prothoma Kadambini.

Plot 
The story is about two orphans, Guriya and Guddu, who fight against all obstacles together to fulfill each other's dreams. As they grow up together in an orphanage in North Bengal, with them evolves a friendship of a lifetime. When Guriya meets with an accident and is diagnosed with a serious illness, Guddu decides to unite her with her family, making all ends meet. The story revolves around how Guddu, with all his might and love for Guriya, goes out of his way, and embarks upon a journey to find Guriya's family in a faraway city. However, they later get separated when he brings her to her family. But when she grows up, she attempts to find him.

Cast

Main 
Pratyusha Paul as Rikhia Bose aka Guriya
Pritha Ghosh as Child Guriya
Jeetu Kamal as Sukumar Bose
Arya Dasgupta / Pratyush Kumar Bandyopadhyay / Uday Pratap Singh Rajput as Guddu/Rocky Rockstar/Raju Bose
Abhirup Sen as Child Guddu

Recurring 
Sritama Bhattacharjee as Mohua, Sukumar's first wife
Krittika Chakraborty as Phooljhuri
Bhaskar Banerjee as Sukumar's Father
Jojo Mukherjee as Romila Chetri/Herembha
Pushpita Mukherjee as Nirmala
Bhola Tamang as Mr. Bonjo
Veronica Mona Dutta as Abira Mukherjee
Bhaswar Chatterjee as Ankush
Rajaa Chatterjee as Vinayak Mukherjee
Debottam Majumder as Abira's Husband,Guriya's Biological Father
Alivia Sarkar as Abira's elder sister
Riyanka Dasgupta as Abira's sister in law
Mousumi Saha as Bijlirani
Piyali Basu as Twarita Bose

Production 
The show is produced by Mahendra Soni, co-founder and Director of SVF.

Music 
The music has been composed by Upali Chattopadhyay and Sobuj Asish.

References

Star Jalsha original programming
2019 Indian television series debuts
2020 Indian television series endings
Bengali-language television programming in India